The Ideal Couple (French: Le couple idéal) is a 1946 French comedy film directed by Bernard-Roland and Raymond Rouleau and starring Raymond Rouleau, Hélène Perdrière and Denise Grey.

Cast

References

Bibliography 
 Rège, Philippe. Encyclopedia of French Film Directors, Volume 1. Scarecrow Press, 2009.

External links 
 

1946 films
1946 comedy films
French comedy films
1940s French-language films
Films directed by Raymond Rouleau
Films directed by Bernard-Roland
French black-and-white films
1940s French films